Toccata Classics is an independent British classic music label founded in 2005.

The founder of Toccata Classics is Martin Anderson, a music journalist. The label was founded primarily to promote unrecorded works by lesser-known composers, including British composers. By 2022 there were around 600 albums in the catalogue. The sponsors of the label were the late Josef Suk, with Vladimir Ashkenazy and Jon Lord.

Artists
Recordings include lesser known works by: 

  Alkan
  Eyvind Alnæs
  Algernon Ashton
  Vytautas Bacevicius
  J. S. Bach/(arr. Sigfrid Karg-Elert)
  Mily Balakirev
  Beethoven/(arr. Karl Xaver Kleinheinz & Friedrich Hermann)
  Georg von Bertouch
  David Braid
  Havergal Brian
  Julius Bürger
  Adolf Busch
  Bellerofonte Castaldi
  Henry Walford Davies
  Edison Denisov
  Heino Eller
  Enescu
  Heinrich Wilhelm Ernst
  Ferenc Farkas
  Arthur Farwell
  Jean Françaix
  Herman Galynin
  John Gardner
  Friedrich Gernsheim
  Peggy Glanville-Hicks
  Alexander Goldenweiser
  Arthur M. Goodhart
  Albert Guinovart
  Arthur Hartmann
  Heinrich von Herzogenberg
  Anselm Hüttenbrenner
  Salomon Jadassohn
  Vladas Jakubenas
  John Joubert
  Khrennikov
  Nikolai Korndorf
  Viktor Stepanovych Kosenko
  Mario Lavista
  Benjamin Lees
  Yuri Levitin
  Charles Harford Lloyd
  Anatoly Lyadov
  Boris Lyatoshynsky
  Sir Alexander Campbell Mackenzie
  Edward Macdowell
  Ester Mägi
  Riccardo Malipiero
  Sir George Martin
  David Matthews
  Janis Medinš
  Krzysztof Meyer
  Robin Milford
  Joaquín Nin-Culmell
  Reinhard Oppel
  Leo Ornstein
  Buxton Orr
  Sir Walter Parratt
  Nikolay Ivanovich Peyko
  John Pickard
  Peteris Plakidis
  Alexander Prior
  Phillip Ramey
  Günter Raphael
  Igor Raykhelson
  Reicha
  Julius Röntgen
  Shebalin
  Percy Sherwood
  Shostakovich
  Leone Sinigaglia
  John Stafford Smith
  Arthur Somervell
  Philip Spratley
  Sir John Stainer
  Peeter Süda
  Marko Tajcevic
  Matthew Taylor
  Jan Ladislav Dussek
  Boris Tchaikovsky
  Alexander Tcherepnin
  Nikolai Tcherepnin
  Telemann
  Ferdinand Thieriot
  Veljo Tormis
  Sir Donald Francis Tovey
  Sergei Vassilenko
  Gareth Walters
  Mieczyslaw Weinberg
  Hans Winterberg
  Charles Wood
  Hugh Wood
  William Wordsworth
  Felix Woyrsch 
  and others

References

External links
 Home page

Classical music record labels
British record labels
Companies established in 2005
2005 establishments in the United Kingdom